Frans Jeppsson Wall (born 19 December 1998), also known mononymously as Frans, is a Swedish singer-songwriter. He represented host nation Sweden in the Eurovision Song Contest 2016 in Stockholm with the song "If I Were Sorry", finishing in fifth place.

Life and career

2006–2015: Early career

Frans was born in Ystad, Sweden. Frans's father Mark was born in Nigeria to a Nigerian mother and a British father. At the age of eight, Mark moved to London. Frans' mother is Swedish. He was thus raised speaking both English and Swedish. During most of his life, Frans has been a part-time resident in London and he also studied music there for an entire year when he was 15 at The Norwood School. He has a younger brother named Casper and a twin sister, named Filippa. He is best known for his football anthems with the band Elias, including the 2006 hit "Who's da Man", dedicated to Swedish footballer Zlatan Ibrahimović. The song, credited to Elias and featuring vocals by Frans, stayed at the top of Sverigetopplistan, the official Swedish Singles Chart, for 13 weeks.

For Christmas 2006, he scored a minor hit with his song "Kul med Jul" (English: Fun with Christmas), which peaked at number 24 on the Swedish singles chart. Another sports-related chart entering by Frans was the 2008 song "Fotbollsfest", a song launched in support of the Sweden national football team. The song peaked at number one on the Swedish singles chart, which it did in its second week of charting.

2016–present: Melodifestivalen and Eurovision
After years of absence from music, Frans returned with his participation in Melodifestivalen 2016 in a bid to represent Sweden at the Eurovision Song Contest 2016 with the song "If I Were Sorry", which he co-wrote with Oscar Fogelström, Michael Saxell and Fredrik Andersson. He performed it in Gävle during the fourth and last semi-final leg of the competition on 27 February 2016, going on to secure a place in the final on 12 March 2016 in Stockholm, Sweden.

Immediately after his performance, the single was released. It became very popular and went straight to number one of Sverigetopplistan during the first week following its release. It also charted on the Spotify Viral charts in Switzerland, Taiwan, Iceland, Uruguay, the United Kingdom, Spain, Norway, France, Denmark, Turkey and Germany. He won the Melodifestivalen final on 12 March 2016 with 156 points, and went on to represent Sweden in the Eurovision Song Contest, also held in Stockholm. At the age of 17, Frans became the second youngest ever Melodifestivalen winner after Carola Häggkvist, who was 16 when she won in 1983. In the Eurovision final, "If I Were Sorry" placed fifth overall.

Discography

Studio albums

Singles

As lead artist

As featured artist

References

Notes

Sources

External links

1998 births
Eurovision Song Contest entrants of 2016
Living people
Melodifestivalen winners
Eurovision Song Contest entrants for Sweden
English-language singers from Sweden
Swedish people of British descent
Swedish people of Nigerian descent
Swedish pop singers
Swedish songwriters
Swedish twins
People from Ystad Municipality
21st-century Swedish singers
21st-century Swedish male singers
Melodifestivalen contestants of 2016